Grenc (in older sources also Grenec) is a settlement in the Municipality of Škofja Loka in the Upper Carniola region of Slovenia.

Urbanization has meant that it has become part of the actual town of Škofja Loka.

References

External links 

Grenc at Geopedia

Populated places in the Municipality of Škofja Loka